Aggamahāpaṇḍita is an honorific Burmese Buddhist title conferred by the Myanmar government to distinguished Theravada Buddhist monks.

Etymology
Aggamahāpandiṭa, meaning "foremost great and wise one," is derived from the following Pali terms:
Agga, from Aggasāvaka, which was conferred by the Buddha to his foremost disciples, Sariputta and Mahamoggallana. 
Mahā, meaning "great."
Paṇḍita, meaning "wise or learned person," and denoting possession of wisdom and knowledge of Tipitaka.

Qualifications
The title is usually awarded to Buddhist monks who are highly proficient in teaching the Dhamma or those who are believed to be enlightened (arahants).  
The title is awarded annually in January by the head of the Burmese government, following after rigorous and subtle examination of a monk's wisdom and achievement by the State Sangha Maha Nayaka Committee.

Recipients must meet the following qualifications:
 Possesses the Aggamahāganthavācakapaṇḍita title
 Has at least 40 years (vassa) in the monkhood
 Is an morally upright person (sīlavanta)
 Has passed the Dhammācariya examination
 Expert writer of Pali commentaries and Pali texts
 Expert teacher of Pali commentaries and Pali texts
 Serves as an abbot for a monastic college (ပရိယတ္တိစာသင်တိုက်)
 Commands authority and influence among Sangha disciples
 Free of accusations and disputes

History
Historically, the Buddha had disciples who held title of Aggasāvaka and Mahāsāvaka who were already enlightened Ariyas and regarded as leaders of the communities of monks known as the Sangha.

From 1915 to 1942, the British colonial government conferred the title Aggamahāpaṇḍita (အဂ္ဂမဟာပဏ္ဍိတ) to 98 monks. From 1951 through 1953, the Burmese government awarded the Aggamahāpaṇḍita title to 15 monks.

List of recipients 
Ledi Sayadaw (1911, Title offered by the Government of India)
Ashin Janakabhivamsa (1948)
Mahasi Sayadaw (1952)
Ambalangoda Polwatte Buddhadatta Thera (1954)
Balangoda Ananda Maitreya Thero (1955)
Sayadaw U Thittila (1956)
Anisakhan Sayadaw U Pandita
Mogok Sayadaw U Vimala (1962)
Mingun Sayadaw U Vicittasarabhivamsa (1979)
Myaungmya Sayadaw U Nyanika (1991)
Birmingham Sayadaw U Rewatadhamma
Sitagu Sayadaw Ashin Nyanissara
Sayadaw U Silananda (1993)
Madihe Pannaseeha Thero (1996)
Sayadaw U Pannavamsa (1998)
Walpola Rahula Thero (1998)
Yaykyi Mingala Kyaungtaik Sayadaw, Bhaddanta Indobhasa
Kotugoda Dhammawasa Thero
Thirikunamale Ananda Thero (2022)
Nyanashri Mahathera (2023)

See also
Burmese Buddhist titles
List of Sāsana Azani recipients
Mahanayaka
Monastic examinations
Sangharaja
Sayadaw
Tipitakadhara Tipitakakovida Selection Examinations

References

External links 
 List of Some Sayadaws with Agga Maha Pandita Title
 "Myanmar Literature Project" - Southeast Asian Studies Passau
 Myanmar Theravada Buddhism website in English

Burmese Buddhist titles